An issue of extremely rare banknotes were issued in 1886 by the Anglo-Egyptian Banking Company Limited for circulation in Malta. The notes all bear the date 1 October 1886. The notes were signed by the Bank's two Managers and the Bank's Accountant. All of them portray Grandmaster Jean Parisot de Valette. The currency that these notes are expressed in is sterling.

Catalogue

PS101. 10 shillings. 1 October 1886. Black on pink paper.
PS102.  1 pound          1 October 1886. Black on pink paper.
PS103.  5 pounds.        1 October 1886. Black on pink paper.
PS104. 10 pounds.        1 October 1886. Black on pink paper.
PS105. 20 pounds.        1 October 1886. Black on pink paper.

References

Standard Catalog of World Paper Money, Specialized Issues (10th Edition). Edited by George S. Cuhaj. Published by Krause Publications.

Anglo-Egyptian Banking Company
Currencies of Malta
1880s in Malta